See History of Turkey. See also the Hittites, Sultanate of Rum, Ottoman Empire and Republic of Turkey.

17th century BCE

16th century BCE

14th century BCE

13th century BCE

12th century BCE

5th century BCE

4th century BCE

2nd century BCE

4th century

5th century

7th century

8th century

9th century

11th century

12th century

13th century

14th century

15th century

16th century

17th century

18th century

19th century

20th century

21st century

See also
 Outline of the Ottoman Empire
 Timeline of the Ottoman Empire
 Timeline of the Republic of Turkey

Cities in Turkey
 Timeline of Ankara
 Timeline of Bursa
 Timeline of Istanbul

References

Bibliography

External links
 
 

Years in Turkey
 
Turkic timelines